Odisha State Highway 5 is a state highway of Odisha, It connects Jaykaypur to Muniguda and ends at Tumudibandha. It has a length of 85 kilometres. At Muniguda, the Odisha State Highway 6 leads off to the northwest to the city of Bhawanipatna.

References

5